This is a list of notable events in country music that took place in 1948.

Events
 April 3 — Radio station KWKH of Shreveport, Louisiana airs the Louisiana Hayride for the first time.
 May 15 — Billboard begins a sales-based Best Selling Folk Retail Records chart, the magazine's second chart to track the popularity of country songs. The new chart complements the existing Most Played Juke Box Folk Records chart, and begins a practice of multiple charts (and possible simultaneous No. 1 songs) that will continue for the next 10 years.
 July 24 — Roy Acuff announces his intention to run for governor of Tennessee. Running as the Republican candidate, he will lose to Democratic candidate Gordon Browning in the November election.

No dates
 Eddy Arnold dominates the Billboard charts, scoring five No. 1 songs (six, if one counts Arnold's "I'll Hold You in My Heart (Till I Can Hold You in My Arms)", which had been No. 1 since November 1947). Only Jimmy Wakely's "One Has My Name (The Other Has My Heart)" breaks Arnold's streak. Four other songs by Arnold also make the country charts.

Top hits of the year

Number one hits
(As certified by Billboard magazine)

Top Hillbilly (Country) Recordings 1948

1948 was the year Eddy Arnold and Country music crossed over to the Billboard magazine mainstream popular charts. Nine of the top ten Country records entered the popular charts, with "Bouquet of Roses" spending 28 weeks, in addition to a record 54 weeks on the Country charts.

The 1948 year-end Country rankings include 'Most-Played Juke Box Folk Records' and 'Best Selling Retail Folk Records' (starting May 15, 1948). With few exceptions, records included entered the charts between November 1947 and December 1948, and received points for their full chart runs. Each week, a score of 15 points is assigned for the no. 1 record, 9 points for no. 2, 8 points for no. 3, and so on, and the total of all weeks from both charts determined the final rank. Number of weeks at number one or total weeks on the chart do not include duplicates; if a record was #1 on both charts on July 15, that counts as one week, not two. Additional information from other sources is reported, but not used for ranking. This includes dates from the "Discography of American Historical Recordings" website, cross-over information from R&B and Pop charts, 'Cashbox', and other sources as noted.

Top new album releases

Births 
 January 28 — Hasse Andersson, Swedish country musician.
 February 8 — Dan Seals, singer-songwriter who successfully turned from pop music to country during the 1980s (died 2009).
 March 23 — David Olney, American singer-songwriter (died 2020).
 April 21 — Paul Davis, pop-styled singer-songwriter who had several hits during the 1980s (died 2008).
 May 2 — Larry Gatlin, singer-songwriter who enjoyed mainstream success in the 1970s and 1980s.
 May 4 — Tim DuBois, music executive.
 May 18 — Joe Bonsall, member of the country-gospel group The Oak Ridge Boys (he's the first tenor).
 June 3 — Fred LaBour, also known as Too Slim, member of Riders in the Sky.
 June 8 — Mats Rådberg, Swedish country musician. (died 2020).
 September 26 — Olivia Newton-John, Australian-born pop vocalist who enjoyed major crossover success in country during the mid-1970s.
 October 2 — Chris LeDoux, world champion bareback rider who sang about the rodeo circuit and cowboy life (died 2005).
 November 6 — Glenn Frey, one of the founding members of country-rock band Eagles (died 2016).
 December 7 — Gary Morris, country-pop singer of the 1980s.
 December 25 — Barbara Mandrell, country-pop singer and multi-instrumentalist of the 1970s and 1980s; host of own television series.
 December 27 - Les Taylor, member of the 1980s group Exile.

Deaths 
 January 15 — Jack Guthrie, 32, folk-styled country singer best known for "Oklahoma Hills" (tuberculosis).
 September 15 — Vernon Dalhart, 55, pioneering influence of the 1920s.

References

Further reading 
 Kingsbury, Paul, Vinyl Hayride: Country Music Album Covers 1947–1989, Country Music Foundation, 2003
 Millard, Bob, Country Music: 70 Years of America's Favorite Music, HarperCollins, New York, 1993
 Whitburn, Joel. Top Country Songs 1944–2005 – 6th Edition. 2005.

Country
Country music by year